The Feynman Prize in Nanotechnology is an award given by the Foresight Institute for significant advances in nanotechnology.  Two prizes are awarded annually, in the categories of experimental and theoretical work. There is also a separate challenge award for making a nanoscale robotic arm and 8-bit adder.

Overview 
The Feynman Prize consists of annual prizes in experimental and theory categories, as well as a one-time challenge award.  They are awarded by the Foresight Institute, a nanotechnology advocacy organization.  The prizes are named in honor of physicist Richard Feynman, whose 1959 talk There's Plenty of Room at the Bottom is considered by nanotechnology advocates to have inspired and informed the start of the field of nanotechnology.

The annual Feynman Prize in Nanotechnology is awarded for pioneering work in nanotechnology, towards the goal of constructing atomically precise products through molecular machine systems.  Input on prize candidates comes from both Foresight Institute personnel, and outside academic and commercial organizations.  The awardees are selected mainly by an annually changing body of former winners and other academics.  The prize is considered prestigious, and authors of one study considered it to be reasonably representative of notable research in the parts of nanotechnology under its scope.

The separate Feynman Grand Prize is a $250,000 challenge award to the first persons to create both a nanoscale robotic arm capable of precise positional control, and a nanoscale 8-bit adder, conforming to given specifications. It is intended to stimulate the field of molecular nanotechnology.

History 
The Feynman Prize was instituted in the context of Foresight Institute co-founder K. Eric Drexler's advocacy of funding for molecular manufacturing. The prize was first given in 1993.  Before 1997, one prize was given biennially.  From 1997 on, two prizes were given each year in theory and experimental categories.  By awarding these prizes early in the history of the field, the prize increased awareness of nanotechnology and influenced its direction.

The Grand Prize was announced in 1995 at the Fourth Foresight Conference on Molecular Nanotechnology and was sponsored by James Von Ehr and Marc Arnold.   In 2004, X-Prize Foundation founder Peter Diamandis was selected to chair the Feynman Grand Prize committee.

Recipients

Single prize

Experimental category

Theory category

See also 

 Kavli Prize in Nanoscience
 IEEE Pioneer Award in Nanotechnology
 ISNSCE Nanoscience Award
 UPenn NBIC Award for Research Excellence in Nanotechnology
 List of physics awards

References

External links
 

Nanotechnology
Awards established in 1993
Academic awards
Challenge awards
Science and technology awards
American science and technology awards